The year 1964 saw a number of significant events in radio broadcasting history.

Events
 January 24 - WBZY 990 AM in Torrington, CT signs off for the last time. 
27 March – The BBC's Children's Hour (renamed "For the Young" since April 1961) is broadcast for the last time.
28 March – Radio Caroline, a pirate radio station based on a ship anchored in international waters off the English coast, opens as Europe's first all-day English-language pop music station.
29 June – Manx Radio, the national commercial radio station for the Isle of Man, begins broadcasting.
1 July
 In Sweden Sveriges Radio launches its third national channel – P3 – as an alternative to commercial pirate radio.
 In the U.S., the Federal Communications Commission adopts the FM Non-Duplication Rule, prohibiting broadcasters in cities with more than 100,000 people from simulcasting the same programming on their AM and FM stations.
 WPEA, the oldest high school radio station, belonging to Phillips Exeter Academy, begins broadcasting.

Births
6 January – Colin Cowherd, American sports radio and television personality.
24 January – Rob Dibble, former Major League Baseball pitcher and sports radio host.
10 February – Glenn Beck, American conservative talk radio and television host.
29 February – Lyndon Byers, former NHL player from Canada, WAAF radio host.
27 May – Adam Carolla, American comedian, comedy writer, radio and television personality and actor.
6 June – Roe Conn, American radio talk show host on WLS in Chicago, Illinois.
22 June – Dicky Barrett, American frontman of skacore band The Mighty Mighty Bosstones, radio personality and announcer for Jimmy Kimmel Live!
23 June – Jane Garvey, English radio presenter.
1 September – Ray D'Arcy, Irish radio and television host
14 October – Jim Rome, American radio and TV personality

Deaths
1 March – Kathryn Card, 71, American radio, television and film actress.
27 August – Gracie Allen, 69, American comedy star of vaudeville, radio, television and film. 
10 October – Eddie Cantor, 72, American comedian, dancer, singer, actor and songwriter. 
14 December – William Bendix, 58, Academy Award-nominated American film actor and radio personality.

References

 
Radio by year